Portugal was represented by Doce, with the song "Bem bom", at the 1982 Eurovision Song Contest, which took place in Harrogate on 24 April. Doce was the winner of the Portuguese national final for the contest, held on 6 March. The song was chosen through a national final organised by broadcaster RTP.

Before Eurovision

Festival da Canção 1982 
The final was held at the Teatro Maria Matos in Lisbon, hosted by Alice Cruz & Fialho Gouveia. The winning song was chosen by the votes of 22 regional juries.

Doce previously came 2nd in the 1980 Portuguese Final and in the 1981 Portuguese Final 4th. Two members of the group (Teresa Miguel & Fatima Padinha) were in the group Gemini that represented Portugal in 1978 as was in Paris in France.

At Eurovision 
On the night of the final Doce performed first in the running order, preceding Luxembourg. At the close of voting "Bem bom" had received 32 points, placing Portugal 13th of the 18 entries. The Portuguese jury awarded its 12 points to the winner song from Germany.

Members of the Portuguese jury included José Vacondeus, Filipa Corte Real, Ilda Cocco Leote, José Eduardo Meira da Cunha, Maria Isabel Soares da Rocha, José Carlos Magalhães Ferreira, Maria José Soveral Gomes,  Mário Nuno dos Santos Queirós, Carlos Ribeiro Luís, Frederico Hogan Teves, and Ana Manuela Preto Pacheco.

Voting

References 

1982
Countries in the Eurovision Song Contest 1982
Eurovision